Linta may refer to:

Ed Linta, American football coach
, a United States Navy patrol vessel in commission from 1917 to 1919